Traversoa is a genus of fungi in the Botryosphaeriaceae family.

The genus was circumscribed by Pier Andrea Saccardo, Hans Sydow and Paul Sydow in Ann. Mycol. vol.11 on page 317 in 1913.

The genus name of Traversoa is in honour of Giovanni Battista Traverso (1878–1955), who was an Italian mycologist and plant pathologist.

Species
As accepted by Species Fungorum;
 Traversoa dothiorelloides 

Former species;
 T. agaves  = Botryodiplodia agaves, Diaporthales family
 T. excipuloides  = Botryodiplodia excipuloides, Diaporthales
 T. excipuloides var. distans  = Botryodiplodia excipuloides, Diaporthales
 T. gallicola  = Botryodiplodia gallicola, Diaporthales

References

Botryosphaeriales